John Francis Lane Mullins  PC, KCSG, JP (12 June 1857 – 24 February 1939) was an Australian politician and prominent Catholic layperson in the late nineteenth and early twentieth century New South Wales.

He was born in Sydney to clerk James Mullins and Eliza Lane from County Cork, Ireland. He studied at the University of Sydney, becoming a solicitor in 1885. On 14 April 1885 he married Jane Hughes, with whom he had five children. He served on Sydney City Council from 1900 to 1904 and from 1906 to 1912, and in 1903 was appointed Knight of St Gregory and Privy Chamberlain to Pope Pius X. From 1917 to 1934 he was a Nationalist (later United Australia Party) member of the New South Wales Legislative Council. Lane Mullins died at Elizabeth Bay in 1939. John Lane Mullins was an avid book collector and was known as the Australian founding father of the Australian Bookplate Movement and was the first President of the Australian Ex Libris Society.

He is buried at South Head Cemetery in Vaucluse, New South Wales.

Arms

References

1857 births
1939 deaths
Directors and Presidents of the Art Gallery of New South Wales
Nationalist Party of Australia members of the Parliament of New South Wales
United Australia Party members of the Parliament of New South Wales
Members of the New South Wales Legislative Council
Papal chamberlains
Knights Commander of the Order of St Gregory the Great
Australian book and manuscript collectors